Tales of Another is an album by American bassist Gary Peacock featuring Keith Jarrett and Jack DeJohnette recorded in 1977 and released on the ECM label.

The album marks the first recording by the group who later became well known as Keith Jarrett's Standards Trio. DeJohnette recalled: "We... came together as a result of Gary's record date... He wanted Keith and I to join him on that. And then after that Manfred [Eicher] suggested to Keith that maybe we should form a trio. So we had a meeting to talk about the music, and we decided we'd play standards, so that it wouldn't be like a 'band' — we'd have flexibility, using the standards as a satellite jumping-off point." Despite the musicians' enthusiasm, the trio did not record together again until January 1983, when they gathered for the sessions that produced Standards, Vol. 1, Standards, Vol. 2, and Changes.

Peacock later recalled his satisfaction with the session: "It was a real eye-opener for me, because I was thinking — "Am I going to have to explain what to do and tell them this and that?... It was such a relief to say to someone, 'Just do whatever comes next', and know that person understands what you're saying from a musical point — not an intellectual point — actually understands it and says 'OK'."

Reception

The AllMusic review by Scott Yanow awarded the album 4 stars and stated "These musicians (who are equals) have played together many times through the years and their support of each other and close communication during these advanced improvisations is quite impressive. It's a good example of Peacock's music".

The authors of The Penguin Guide to Jazz commented: "there is a wonderful coherence to his solo work... which quashes any suggestion that this is another Jarrett album, politely or generously reattributed... the pianist is clearly at home with Peacock's music and there is a level of intuition at work which became the basis of their later standards performances."

Jarrett biographer Ian Carr called the recording "one of the classic albums of the 1970s," and wrote: "Even on this first meeting, the trio has an almost mystical rapport and there is a joy and vivacity in the whole performance which seems to make the music glow... the music has a vital maturity and youthfulness."

Track listing
All compositions by Gary Peacock
 "Vignette" - 7:06
 "Tone Field" - 7:58
 "Major Major" - 9:05
 "Trilogy, No. 1" - 8:34
 "Trilogy, No. 2" - 9:46
 "Trilogy, No. 3" - 6:20
Recorded in February 1977 at Generation Sound Studios, New York.

Personnel
Keith Jarrett – piano
Gary Peacock - bass
Jack DeJohnette - drums

References

ECM Records albums
Gary Peacock albums
Jack DeJohnette albums
1977 albums
Albums produced by Manfred Eicher